The 1952 Texas Longhorns football team represented the University of Texas in the 1952 college football season.

Schedule

Awards and honors
 Bud McFadin, Guard, Cotton Bowl Classic Co-Most Valuable Player
 Bud McFadin, Consensus All-American

References

Texas
Texas Longhorns football seasons
Southwest Conference football champion seasons
Cotton Bowl Classic champion seasons
Texas Longhorns football